Basketane is a polycyclic alkane with the chemical formula C10H12. The name is taken from its structural similarity to a basket shape. Basketane was first synthesized in 1966, independently by Masamune and Dauben and Whalen. A patent application published in 1988 used basketane, which is a hydrocarbon, as a source material in doping thin diamond layers because of the molecule's high vapor pressure, carbon ring structure, and fewer hydrogen-to-carbon bond ratio.

Chemical nomenclature 
In the year 1989 and before the synthesis of basketane, historic chemists were intrigued by the structural make-up of molecules, specifically those in objects seen in everyday life. Using supramolecular chemistry, molecules such as cubane and basketane were named according to their corresponding shape and historically revealed certain characteristics and personal motives of chemists at that time. Naming these uniquely shaped molecules were also done considering chemical nomenclature such as adding "-anes" for single carbon-carbon bonds and "-enes" for double carbon-carbon bonds to the end of the appropriate molecules.

Synthesis 
The synthesis of basketane reported by Masamune begins with a Diels–Alder reaction between cyclooctatetraene (1) and maleic anhydride (2), giving the polycyclic anhydride 3, which photoisomerizes in acetone via an intramolecular cyclization to give 4 at a 40% yield. Hydrolysis of the anhydride followed by treatment with lead tetraacetate affords the unsaturated basketene (5), which is then hydrogenated to basketane (6).

An alternative synthetic route with better overall yield uses 1,4-benzoquinone and cyclohexa-1,3-diene as starting materials. 1,4-Benzoquinone (1) is first converted to 2,5-dibromo-1,4-benzoquinone (2), which reacts in a Diels–Alder reaction with cyclohexa-1,3-diene (3) to form the polycyclic diketone 4. This diketone photoisomerizes to 1,6-dibromopentacyclo[6.4.0.03,6.04,12.05,9]dodeca-2,7-dione (5), which undergoes a pseudo-Favorskii rearrangement in a 25% aqueous solution of sodium hydroxide, giving the dicarboxylic acid 6. The acid is decarboxylated with a modified Hunsdiecker reaction to a dibromide 7, which is reductively debrominated with tributyltin hydride to basketane (8) at a 11% yield relative to the starting material cyclohexa-1,3-diene.

A 1994 synthesis by Binmore starts with homocubanone, a cubane derivative, forming basketane via the basketyl radical. The synthesis functions by forcing cubane rings to be opened up via structural strain to create the chemical bonds necessary for this rigid molecule. This method is known as ring expansion where one part of two conjoined ringed are opened and rearranged to remove barriers between the two ring systems. Cyclobutylmethyl radicals that rearrange and open into structures such as basketane and cubane are favorable rearrangements with free energy barriers around 0.3 kcal/mol.

Properties 
Basketane and other polycyclic, cage-like molecules do not conform to simple carbon-carbon bonds with angles of 109.5 degrees due to their strained system. The strain energy causes thermodynamic instability resulting in higher combustion and heat release. When taking a mass analysis, the mass spectrum graph for basketane has a distinct tall peak at 39 m/z distinguishing a clear cyclic structure.

Transition metals catalyze the valence isomerization of basketane and substituted derivatives. Silver perchlorate catalyzes its isomerization to the compound snoutane.

Using other transition metals for this reaction affords a mixture of snoutane or the corresponding snoutane derivative with a tricyclic diene. The ratio of the products depends on the nature of the catalyst used and the substitutions on the basketane.

In the hydrogenation of basketane with palladium on carbon, it absorbs an equivalent amount of hydrogen gas. The initial assumption by Masamune was that the bond between C4 and C5 opens to give the symmetric hydrocarbon tetracyclo[4.4.0.02,9.05,8]decane, but Musso later showed that it is the bond between C3 and C4 (or equivalently C4 and C7) that breaks, giving the dihydrobasketane tetracyclo[4.4.0.02,5.03,8]decane. Further hydrogenation breaks the C5-C6 bond to give the hydrocarbon twistane.

See also
Cubane
List of chemical compounds with unusual names

References

Further reading
 

Cyclobutanes